848 Naval Air Squadron was a squadron of the Royal Navy Fleet Air Arm. It operated the Westland Sea King HC.4 helicopter and previously provided advanced flying training to pilots for the other squadrons in the Commando Helicopter Force. The squadron was based at RNAS Yeovilton in Somerset and was decommissioned on 24 March 2016.

History

Second World War

Whirlwind years

The squadron reformed at RNAS Gosport (HMS Siskin) on 29 October 1952 with American-built Westland Whirlwind HAS.21s for work in Malaya.
848 Squadron 26 whirlwind MK 7 aircraft joined HMS Bulwark in early 1960 and deployed to the Far East for two and a half years - when the ship was in Singapore the squadron detached to the shore base HMS Sinbang RNAS Sembawang (HQ of the 3rd Commando Brigade & 42 Commando RM). In December 1962 848 returned on HMS Bulwark to Plymouth and detached to its new home HMS Seahawk RNAS Culdrose.

Wessex and Wasp years

848 reformed at RNAS Culdrose on 7 May 1964 with 18 Westland Wessexes. Between August 1967 and April 1973 these were joined by Westland Wasp HAS.1's.

During its 69-year history, 848 Squadron had been disbanded and reformed several times but had a more permanent standing, having been made the Commando Helicopter Training Squadron, based at RNAS Yeovilton.

Part of this Squadron was taken to form 847 NAS during Operation Corporate to retake the Falkland Islands 1982. The Squadron operated Westland Wessex HU.5 aircraft at this time.

Sea King years

As the gulf crisis loomed, 848 Squadron was recalled, reforming with the Sea King HC4 on 16 November 1990 and went on to serve in Operations Desert Shield and Desert Storm. After the conflict it returned to the UK and was disbanded again on 19 April 1991.

The Squadron restarted again in March 1995 took the role from 707 NAS which was responsible for the training of aircrew and maintainers in the Commando role.

With a complement of one hundred ratings and thirty officers, the Squadron was responsible for the instruction of up to sixty pilots and aircrewmen each year. Operating the Westland Sea King HC.4, pilots undertook Advanced Flying Training - how to handle emergencies and how to fly with sole reference to instruments - before crewing up with the aircrewmen, Ratings taken from the Royal Navy Royal Marines, to learn how to operate the aircraft in a tactical environment during operational flying training.

The Squadron also trained more than one hundred and fifty helicopter maintainers annually before sending them to the front line. Aircrew and maintainers received military and amphibious training and were taught how to operate in the field and from the deck of a ship.

848 NAS disbanded in 2013. It reformed on 1 May 2015 as an operational Sea King HC.4 squadron; this was to allow 845 NAS to convert to the Merlin without a loss of operational capability.

It was decommissioned on 24 March 2016.

Aircraft operated
The squadron operated a variety of different aircraft and versions:
 Grumman Avenger I & II
 Fairey Swordfish I
 Westland Whirlwind HAR.21, HAR.1, HAS.22 & HAS.7
 Westland Wasp HAS.1
 Westland Wessex HU.5
 Westland Sea King HC.4

Affiliations
The squadron had a number of affiliations:
 The Pirate Trust
 Downside School Combined Cadet Force (CCF)
 Birmingham University Royal Naval Unit (URNU)
 Crewkerne Branch of The Royal British Legion

References

Citations

Bibliography

External links

848
Military units and formations established in 1943
Military units and formations of the United Kingdom in the Falklands War